Neoprincipia is interpreted as the earliest crown-group red algae.

References

Fossil algae
Carboniferous life